The 1945–46 NCAA men's basketball season began in December 1945, progressed through the regular season and conference tournaments, and concluded with the 1946 NCAA basketball tournament championship game on March 26, 1946, at Madison Square Garden in New York, New York. The Oklahoma A&M Aggies won their second NCAA national championship with a 43–40 victory over the North Carolina Tar Heels.

Season headlines 

 The Middle Atlantic States Conference North began play, with five original members.
 The New England Conference disbanded at the end of the season.
 The NCAA tournament began holding a national third-place game between the teams which lost in the semifinals. The national third-place game would continue through the 1981 tournament.
 In 1995, the Premo-Porretta Power Poll retroactively selected  as its national champion for the 1945–46 season.

Conference membership changes

Regular season

Conference winners and tournaments

Statistical leaders

Post-season tournaments

NCAA tournament

Semifinals & finals 

 Third Place – Ohio State 63, California 45

National Invitation tournament

Semifinals & finals 

 Third Place – West Virginia 65, Muhlenberg 40

Awards

Consensus All-American teams

Major player of the year awards 

 Helms Player of the Year: Bob Kurland, Oklahoma A&M

Other major awards 

 NIT/Haggerty Award (Top player in New York City metro area): Sid Tanenbaum, NYU

Coaching changes 

A number of teams changed coaches during the season and after it ended.

References